The German Social Party may refer to:
German Social Party (German Empire)
German Social Party (Weimar Republic)